Mannhardt is a surname. Notable people with the surname include:

 Johann Mannhardt (1798–1878), German clockmaker, mechanic, and inventor
 Wilhelm Mannhardt (1831–1880), German scholar and folklorist

See also
 Mainhardt, a town in Baden-Württemberg, Germany
 Meinhardt (disambiguation)